Quercus myrtifolia, the myrtle oak, is a North American species of oak. It is native to the southeastern United States (Mississippi, Alabama, Florida, Georgia, South Carolina). It is often found in coastal areas on sandy soils.

It has leaves with no teeth or lobes, which are hairless on the upperside and also on the underside except along the veins.

References

External links

Atlas of Florida Vascular Plants
Florida Native Plant Society
Pollen Library
Discover Life

myrtifolia
Trees of the Southeastern United States
Plants described in 1805